"An Open Letter to NYC" is a song by American hip hop group Beastie Boys. It was released in November 2004 by Capitol Records as the fourth and final single from their sixth studio album, To the 5 Boroughs (2004). The single entered and peaked at number 38 on the UK Singles Chart. The song was used during the opening credits of an episode of HBO's Taxicab Confessions, and is also included in the video game NBA Street V3. The group performed the song live during the 2004 MTV Europe Music Awards, on November 18, 2004 at the Tor di Valle Hippodrome, in Rome.

Composition
The song's lyrics talk about the group's affection for their hometown, New York City. It alludes to the 9/11 terrorist attacks but also implies there are deeper flaws in the system people need to acknowledge and come together as a community, or suffer as a whole. The song samples "Sonic Reducer" by The Dead Boys, and also features a brief sample of "New York's My Home" by Robert Goulet. The Goulet sample was cut from the Solid Gold Hits version of the song.

Track listing

12" vinyl
 Capitol — 7243 8 16523 1 2

CD
Capitol — 6189572, EMI/Parlophone — 70876 19857 2 8

Charts

In popular culture
In the pilot of Succession, Kendall Roy is introduced singing along to the song on headphones.

References

2004 songs
2004 singles
Beastie Boys songs
Capitol Records singles
Songs about letters (message)
Songs about New York City
Songs written by Ad-Rock
Songs written by Mike D
Songs written by Adam Yauch